The 111th Brigade was a formation of  the British Army during the First World War. It was raised, under the command of Brigadier-General Reginald Barnes, as part of the new army also known as Kitchener's Army and assigned to the 37th Division. The brigade was also attached to the 34th Division from July to August 1916.

Formation
 This brigade was attached to 34th Division between 6 July and 22 August 1916
10th (Service) Battalion, Royal Fusiliers
13th (Service) Battalion, Royal Fusiliers (moved to 112th Brigade 4 February 1918)
13th (Service) Battalion, King’s Royal Rifle Corps
13th (Service) Battalion, Rifle Brigade
111th Machine Gun Company (joined 4 March 1916, moved to 37th Battalion M.G.C. 4 March 1918)
111th Trench Mortar Battery (formed 2 July 1916)

References

Infantry brigades of the British Army in World War I